Myristicin is a naturally occurring compound found in common herbs and spices, the most well known being nutmeg. It is an insecticide, and has been shown to enhance the effectiveness of other insecticides in combination. Myristicin is also a precursor for substituted amphetamine derivative compounds structurally related to MMDA and MDMA; it was believed to be metabolized in the liver into MMDA, but unlikely since no MMDA was found in urine, in the body it produces hallucinogenic effects, and can be converted to MMDMA in controlled chemical synthesis. It interacts with many enzymes and signaling pathways in the body,  is cytotoxic to living cells, and may also have chemoprotective properties.

Uses 
Isolated myristicin has proven an effective insecticide against many agricultural pests, including Aedes aegypti mosquito larvae, Spilosoma obliqua (hairy caterpillars), Epilachna varivestis (Mexican bean beetles), Acyrthosiphon pisum (pea aphids), mites, and Drosophila melanogaster (fruit flies). Myristicin was shown to be an effective repellant, and to cause mortality via direct and systemic exposure. It also displayed a synergistic effect when administered to insects in combination with existing insecticides.

The structure of myristicin closely resembles that of amphetamine compounds, and it is capable of producing psychotropic effects similar to MDMA compounds. Because of this, it can be used in synthetic synthesis to create amphetamine derivatives, and create designer drugs like MMDMA that are similar in structure and effect to MDMA. Out of the common spices that contain myristicin, nutmeg has the highest relative concentration of the compound. Therefore, it is used most frequently to isolate myristicin or exploit its effects. 

Furthermore, myristicin interferes with multiple signaling pathways and enzyme processes in the body. It is toxic to cells and also may have chemoprotective properties, making it an interesting topic for further pharmacological or therapeutic research. [See Pharmacology, Toxicity]

Sources of myristicin 
Myristicin can be found in nutmeg, black pepper, and many members of the Umbelliferae family including anise, carrots, parsley, celery, dill, and parsnip.

Trace amounts have also been isolated from a variety of plant species including Ridolfia segetum (harvest fennel), species of the Oenanthe genus (water dropworts), species of the Lamiaceae family (mint, sage, or deadnettle families),  Cinnamomum glanduliferum (Nepal camphor tree), and Piper mullesua ("Hill Pepper").

Depending on the conditions of growth and storage of the plant, a high quality nutmeg (Myristica fragrans) seed can contain up to 13 mg of myristicin per 1 gram, or 1.3%. In the isolated essential oils, myristicin constitutes on average 13.24% of nutmeg oil, 6.32% of parsley leaf oil, 7.63% of dill herb oil, and 0.18% of celery seed oil.

Physiological effects

Psychoactive effects 
There is more research needed on the exact mechanism of action of myristicin in the body. A 400 mg dose of myristicin has been shown to produce “mild cerebral stimulation” in 4 out of 10 human subjects. Myristicin is most commonly consumed in nutmeg, and 400 mg would be contained in approximately 15 g of nutmeg powder. However, at a minimum dose of about 5 g of nutmeg powder, symptoms of nutmeg intoxication can begin to emerge, indicating the interaction of other compounds contained in nutmeg. elemicin, eugenol, and safrole are also components of nutmeg that, while at lower concentrations than myristicin, are thought to contribute to the hallucinogenic and physiological symptoms of nutmeg intoxication.

Nutmeg is often described as feeling similar to THC in lower doses. This is believed to be because of interactions between the psychoactive chemicals in nutmeg and the endocannabinoid system. Common effects include dizziness, drowsiness, and confusion. However, in higher amounts, it is often times compared to other deliriants due to its strong hallucinogenic effects. In 2015, a 37-year old ingested 2 teaspoons of nutmeg and experienced delirium, reportedly being unable to find the dining hall in her hotel and was unable to recognise her colleagues. She continued to feel the previously mentioned common effects for at least 36 hours after.

See toxicity for more information on psychoactive effects.

Pharmacology 
Myristicin is additionally known to be a weak inhibitor of monoamine oxidase (MAO), a liver enzyme in humans that metabolizes neurotransmitters (e.g., serotonin, dopamine, epinephrine, and norepinephrine). It lacks the basic nitrogen atom that is typical of MAO inhibitors (MAOIs), potentially explaining a weaker inhibitory effect.

While smaller concentrations of MAOIs may not cause problems, there are additional warnings regarding drug interactions. Those taking antidepressants that are MAOIs (such as phenelzine, isocarboxazid, tranylcypromine or selegiline) or taking selective serotonin re-uptake inhibiting (SSRI) antidepressants should avoid essential oils rich in myristicin, such as that of nutmeg or anise.

Metabolites 
Myristicin has been noted to be enzymatically hydroxylated into 1'-hydroxymyristicin and enzymatically formed 5-allyl-1-methoxy-2,3-dihydroxybenzene (oxidation of the methylenedioxy group). Myristicin is also formed into demethylenylmyristicin, dihydroxymyristicin, and elemicin is formed into O-demethylelemicin, O-demethyldihydroxyelemicin, and safrole to demethylenylsafrole. 
It was initially hypothesized that elemicin and myristicin can form known hallucinogenic drugs following amination processes (formation of 3,4-methylenedioxy-5-methoxyamphetamine from myristicin and mescaline from elemicin) since the only structural modification is said amination; this pathway was initially doubted to occur and has not been demonstrated in vivo. Other studies on the metabolism of myristicin or elemicin, either in vitro or in vivo, have failed to detect either mescaline or amphetamine-like compounds and measuring human urine following nutmeg ingestion has failed to find the aforementioned amphetamine derivative. Research on breakdown of myristicin.

Myristicin also has potential chemoprotective properties. In mouse liver and small intestine mucosa, myristicin induced higher levels of glutathione S-transferase (GST), which catalyzes a reaction that detoxifies activated carcinogens. This indicates that myristicin may act as an inhibitor of tumorigenesis. It is still unknown how much the tendency of myristicin to induce apoptosis in cells contributes to its chemoprotective abilities.

Toxicity 
Myristicin has been proven to be cytotoxic, or toxic to living cells. Specifically, it stimulates cytochrome c release, which activates caspase cascades and induces early apoptosis in the cells.
In human neuroblastoma SK-N-SH cells, myristicin led to apoptosis and observable morphological changes, as well as chromatin condensation and DNA fragmentation. This indicates a definite cytotoxic effect, and a potential neurotoxic effect that requires further investigation.
Myristicin has also been shown to inhibit cytochrome P450 enzymes in humans, which is responsible for metabolizing a variety of substrates including hormones and toxins, allowing these substrates to accumulate. This can compound its own toxicity and/or lead to increased bioavailability of other substances, which can lower the threshold for overdose from other drugs that may be in the body.

The effects of nutmeg consumed in large doses are attributed mostly to myristicin, where 1–7 hours following ingestion symptoms include disorientation, giddiness, stupor, and/or stimulation of the central nervous system leading to euphoria, mild to intense hallucinations (similar to deliriants, walls and ceiling glitching or breathing), disorientation to time and surroundings, disassociation, feelings of levitation, feeling of fuzziness similar to THC but heavier, head feeling pressurized, loss of consciousness, tachycardia, weak pulse, anxiety, and hypertension. Symptoms of nutmeg intoxication further include nausea, abdominal pain, vomiting, minor to severe muscle spasms (severe in extreme overdose), headache, dryness of mouth, mydriasis or miosis, hypotension, shock, and potentially death.

Myristicin poisoning can be detected by testing levels of myristicin in the blood. There are currently no known antidotes for myristicin poisoning, and treatment focuses on symptom management and potential sedation in cases of extreme delirium or aggravation.

Chemistry 
  With a chemical structure resembling amphetamines and other precursors, myristicin can also be used to synthesize illicit hallucinogenic drugs. Under controlled conditions, myristicin isolated from nutmeg oil can be converted into MMDMA, a synthetic "designer drug" amphetamine derivative that is less potent than MDMA but produces comparable stimulant and hallucinogenic effects.
Myristicin is soluble in ethanol, ether, and acetone, but insoluble in water

References 

Plant toxin insecticides
Monoamine oxidase inhibitors
Phenylpropenes
O-methylated phenylpropanoids
O-methylated natural phenols
Benzodioxoles
Allyl compounds
Pyrogallol ethers
Plant toxins